The Santa Fe Rugby Union is the governing body for rugby union in Santa Fe Province in Argentina. The union runs rugby competitions in the province of Santa Fe with the exception of Rosario clubs, who are part of the Unión de Rugby de Rosario.

USR is one of the Argentine Rugby Union's 25 regional governing bodies. The Unión Santafesina also runs the Santa Fe team that represented the province in the now defunct Campeonato Argentino.

The best placed teams of USR competitions qualify to play the Torneo del Litoral, along with clubs from the Rosario and Entre Ríos Unions. A Santa Fe championship also exists for the clubs at underage levels.

History
In 1949 the Unión de Rugby del Río Paraná was founded. Its role was to represent and organise competitions for clubs from both Santa Fe and Entre Ríos provinces.

Due to different point of views the URRP was split in two soon after. Clubs from Entre Ríos would go on to form the Unión Entrerriana de Rugby and clubs from Santa Fe the "Unión Santafesina de Rugby".

Clubs 
, affiliated clubs that participate in competitions organised by the USR are:

See also
Torneo del Litoral
Unión de Rugby de Rosario
Argentine Rugby Union

Notes

References

External links
 

San
Sport in Santa Fe Province

Sports organizations established in 1955
1955 establishments in Argentina